The Judo Competition at the 2005 Mediterranean Games was held in the Rafael Florido Sports Hall in Almería, Spain from 28 June to 1 July 2005.

Medal overview

Men

Women

Medal table

References
Results of the 2005 Mediterranean Games (JudoInside.com)

Mediterranean Games
J
2005
Judo competitions in Spain